Davis Island may refer to:

Landforms

Antarctica
Davis Island (Palmer Archipelago)

Asia
Davis Island (Mergui Archipelago)

North America
Davis Island (Connecticut)
Witch Island (a.k.a. Davis Island), Maine
Davis Island (Mississippi)
Davis Island (Pennsylvania)

Oceania
Davis Island, New Zealand, Auckland Islands
Davis Land, a phantom island

Townships
Davis Islands (Tampa), a neighborhood in Tampa, Florida, U.S.
 Davis Island Town Site, Island Falls, Saskatchewan, Canada

See also
 David Island, Antarctica
 Davids Island (disambiguation), several places